Delme is a commune in the Moselle department in Grand Est in north-eastern France. It was the center of the former canton of Delme until 2015. It had a population of 1,148 in 2019.

Geography
Delme is located 30 km to the southeast of Metz and 27 km northeast of Nancy. Next communes: Tincry and Prévocourt in the northeast, Viviers in the east, Donjeux, Laneuveville-en-Saulnois and Oriocourt in the southeast, Lemoncourt in the south, Puzieux, Alaincourt-la-Côte and Xocourt in the northwest. Its area is 5.09 km2 and its elevation ranges between 208 and 280 m.

History 
In 1790, Delme joined the Meurthe department.

During his reign, Napoleon I would have made several stops in Delme. 

The commune was integrated into Alsace–Lorraine following the French defeat in the Franco-Prussian War of 1870, then returned to France following the First World War in 1918.

On the afternoon of September 3, 1944, the railway yard was bombed by American shells. The commune, wounded by the fighting, will not be liberated until November 17, 1944.

Education
 College Andre Malraux

Famous natives
 Victor Lemoine (1823—1911). Famous French selector of ornamental plants who in particular created many grades of a lilac.

See also
Communes of the Moselle department

References

External links

 Official website
 Collège André Malraux
 Centre d'art contemporaine La synagogue de Delme
 Synagogue de Delme

Communes of Moselle (department)
Three Bishoprics